A Sucked Orange is an album by Nurse With Wound, consisting of 29 mostly brief, unused pieces, elements or alternate versions of tracks from Nurse With Wound's recording career up to 1988. Steven Stapleton compiled the album prior to moving to Ireland; he was unable to take his tape archive with him and decided to salvage the fragments that make up this album before destroying them.

Some of the track titles are particularly literal, with titles such as "A Little Missing Part Of Homotopy to Marie" or "Pleasant Banjo Intro With Irritating Squeak". There is some crossover between the track listings of A Sucked Orange and the cassette-only release "Scrag", issued in 1987.

The album was originally released on compact disc and vinyl in 1989, with the CD being re-pressed in 1995. A 2CD reissue pairing the album with "Scrag" was issued on the Dirter Promotions label in 2013.

Track listing
 Pleasant Banjo Intro With Irritating Squeak (0:43)
 It's All Gone Weird (0:42)
 Spiral Theme (2:02)
 Man Is The Animal (0:45)
 A Precise History Of Industrial Music (0:41)
 Raymonde Fluffs It (0:05)
 Musical Bovine Spongiform (The Mad Cow Two-Step) (1:40)
 I'm A Frayed Knot (4:14)
 Sinan Sings for Her Chums (1:41)
 It Just Ain't So (1:10)
 Nasal Hair (1:49)
 Rockette Morton Part One (4:13)
 Rockette Morton Part Two (3:11)
 Dogs Breath Rising (0:51)
 This Piano Can't Think (1:20)
 Crack Up (1:50)
 Scissor Rock Bicycle Revelation (2:24)
 Dream Of A Butterfly Inside The Skull Of A Horse (1:22)
 Raymonde Cries A River (1:27)
 Fade / Crack Down (1:32)
 Ritva Sings For The World (2:36)
 Peccadillo (1:38)
 Great-God-Father-Nieces (2:04)
 It Just Ain't So (Slight Return) (0:27)
 A Little Missing Part Of Homotopy To Marie (1:36)
 S.B.B. Dragged through a Hedge Backwards (2:23)
 Scrapie (1:11)
 Flea Bite (1:45)
 Scrambled Egg Rebellion In The Smegma Department (2:43)

References

1990 albums
Nurse with Wound albums
Sound collage albums